Lakeview Centennial High School is a public secondary school in Garland, Texas, United States. It enrolls students in grades 9–12 and is a part of the Garland Independent School District.

The school's name derives from two sources: "Lakeview" from its location near Lake Ray Hubbard and "Centennial" as it opened during the American bicentennial year of 1976.

Notable alumni
 Derrick Dockery, NFL football player
 Samuel Eguavoen, football player
 Anu Emmanuel, actress
 William Jackson Harper, actor: best known for his role as Chidi Anagonye on the NBC comedy The Good Place (2016-2020) 
Chris Jones (born 1993), basketball player for Maccabi Tel Aviv of the Israeli Basketball Premier League 
Scott Kirby, CEO of United Airlines 
 James Lankford, United States Senator (R-OK)
 Keith Mitchell, former NFL player
 Adrienne Reese, WWE wrestler
 Dean Sams, founding member of Lonestar
 Stacy Sanches, 1996 Playboy Playmate of the Year
 Zhaire Smith, NBA basketball player 
 Valerian Ume-Ezeoke, NFL player
 Chris Warren, Liga Nacional de Baloncesto Profesional  basketball player

References

External links 

 

Educational institutions established in 1976
High schools in Garland, Texas
Magnet schools in Texas
Garland Independent School District high schools
1976 establishments in Texas